"Legalize" is a song by Nigerian singer Mr Eazi, released on 10 June 2022, through emPawa Africa. "Legalize" was written by Mr Eazi and produced by emPawa head of music, and record producer E-Kelly, Michael Brun, and Nonso Amadi. The music video, was shot by Federico Mazzarisi in Venice and released the same day, with a cameo appearance from the Nigerian actress Temi Otedola.

Background
On 10 April, Temi Otedola got engaged to Mr Eazi. In a press release, he said “I started the song in Michael Brun’s house on some edibles, freestyling, and later went to London and listened to what I’d recorded, and realized what the song was about. I’ve been thinking of asking Temi to marry me for a long time, so I guess it was in my subconscious” During the press, he said: “It’s more like this song is for me, after arranging to shoot the song video in Venice and purchasing an engagement ring, I felt the set would be the ideal location to propose.” and added, “No one on set knew what was going to happen.”

Documentary

Behind-the-scenes photos were released through BellaNaija on 8 June 2022. The cover image, is an artwork painted by the Beninese artist Patricorel, which also features in "Legalize: The Art Experience" a short film, starring Mr Eazi, Patricorel, Liya, Joey Akan, Wadude, Rukky Ojukoko, Tochi Louis, Minz, Zuwa, and Fidel. The documentary was produced by A Family Picture in Cotonou and released on 9 June.

Commercial performance
On 19 June 2022, "Legalize" debuted at number 13 on the UK Official Afrobeats Single Top 20 Chart. On 20 June 2022, "Legalize" debuted at number 31, on Nigeria TurnTable Top 50 chart. On 22 June 2022, "Legalize" debuted on at number 30 on TurnTable Top 50 Airplay, and number 38 on TurnTable Top 50 Streaming Songs.

Music video
On 10 June 2022, Mr Eazi released the music video for "Legalize", through emPawa Africa. The visual features a cameo appearance from his finance Temi Otedola. The visual was directed by Federico Mazzarisi in Venice.

Personnel
Oluwatosin Ajibade - Primary artist, writer, executive producer
Production
E-Kelly - Co-producer, co-executive producer
Michael Brun - Co-producer
Nonso Amadi - Co-producer
Temi Otedola - Cameo appearance

Documentary cast

Patricorel
Liya
Joey Akan
Wadude
Rukky Ojukoko
Tochi Louis
Minz
Zuwa
Fidela

Charts

Weekly charts

Release history

References

2022 songs
2022 singles
Mr Eazi songs
Nigerian afropop songs